Poecilurus is an obsolete genus of birds formerly classified in the Furnariidae (ovenbird) family from South America. It contained three species:
 White-whiskered spinetail
 Hoary-throated spinetail
 Ochre-cheeked spinetail

Today all major authorities include these species in the genus Synallaxis, but unlike the other members of that genus, species formerly classified in the genus Poecilurus have closely webbed, broad-tipped, and soft tail feathers. Despite this difference, genetic evidence supports maintaining them in Synallaxis.

References 

Furnariidae
Bird genera
Obsolete bird taxa
Taxa named by W. E. Clyde Todd